Puragi, or Iwaro, is a Papuan language of the Bird's Head Peninsula spoken in Puragi village, Matemani District, South Sorong Regency, West Papua.

Distribution
Locations within Sorong Selatan Regency:

Matemani District: Saga and Puragi villages
Inanwatan District: Isogo village

References

Nuclear South Bird's Head languages